Fadane Hamadi (born 21 July 1992) is a track and field athlete from Comoros. He competed in the men's 110m hurdles event at the 2020 Summer Olympics.

References 

Living people
1992 births
Athletes (track and field) at the 2020 Summer Olympics
Olympic athletes of the Comoros
Comorian male hurdlers